James Cerretani and Antal van der Duim were the defending champions and successfully defended their title, defeating Austin Krajicek and Mitchell Krueger 6–2, 5–7, [10–8] in the final.

Seeds

Draw

References
 Main Draw

Open de Guadeloupe - Doubles